Albrook is a Panama Metro station which, as of November 2016, serves as the southern terminus of Line 1. It was one of the metro network's first 11 stations, opened on 5 April 2014. The station provides access to the city's main bus terminal and Albrook Mall In its first year of operations, Albrook was the third most used station on the network.

Gallery

References

Panama Metro stations
2014 establishments in Panama
Railway stations opened in 2014